The Kingdom of Majorca was a realm on the east coast of Spain, which included certain Mediterranean islands, and which was founded by James I of Aragon, also known as James The Conqueror. In a will written in 1262 after the death of his firstborn son Alfonso, he ceded the kingdom to his son James. The disposition was maintained during successive versions of his will and so when James I died in 1276, the Crown of Aragon passed to his eldest son Peter, known as Peter III of Aragon or Peter the Great. The Kingdom of Majorca passed to James, who reigned under the name of James II of Majorca. After 1279, Peter III of Aragon established that the King of Majorca was a vassal to the king of Aragon. The title continued to be employed by the Aragonese and Spanish monarchs until its dissolution by the 1715 Nueva Planta decrees.

Geography
The kingdom included the Balearic Islands: Majorca, Menorca (which was still under the rule of Muslims until 1231 when its sovereignty was surrendered to James I), Ibiza and Formentera. The king was also lord of the mainland counties of Roussillon and Cerdanya, and the territories James I kept in Occitania: the signory of Montpellier, the viscountcy of Carlat in Auvergne, and the barony of Aumelas, contiguous with Montpellier.

History

The legacy of James I included the creation of a strategic Mediterranean enclave, including territories between two large kingdoms, the Capetians of France and the Crown of Aragon, which were in constant conflict at the time. Conscious of the fragility of the Kingdom of Majorca, James I undertook the conquest of Cerdanya to unify the new kingdom. He also entered into negotiations to arrange the marriage of his son James to Beatrice of Savoy, daughter to Count Amadeus of Savoy. Neither plan was successful.

On the death of James I, the new King of Majorca, James II, decided not to pay tribute to Peter III of Aragon. Preoccupied with diverse problems within the realm, it was not until 1279 when the Majorcan monarch reconciled to have his states recognized as subordinate to the King of Aragon. As a consequence the Kingdom of Majorca could not hold court, and the King of Majorca was forced to go to Catalonia to present tribute to the King of Aragon. By means of the Treaty of Perpignan in 1279, an imbalance of power between the Kingdom of Aragon and the Kingdom of Majorca was created. The Aragonese king maintained the political and economic control of Aragon over the Kingdom of Majorca, reestablishing the unified jurisdiction of the Crown of Aragon, which was broken by the will of James I. This treaty would condition relations between the Kingdom of Majorca and the Crown of Aragon throughout the former's existence. The lack of courts later aggravated the destabilization of a kingdom already on the brink of fracture, which, besides this, lacked any common institution beyond the monarchy.

During the Aragonese Crusade, James II of Majorca allied himself with the Pope and the French against Peter of Aragon. As a result, Peter's successor Alfonso conquered the kingdom in 1286. However, by the Treaty of Anagni in 1295, James II of Aragon was required to restore the Balearics to James of Majorca.

On the death of James II of Majorca's son Sancho in 1324, James III took the throne at the age of nine, necessitating a regency council headed by his uncle Philip to govern the realm. The situation was difficult since James II of Aragon did not renounce his claim to the Majorcan throne. In 1325, Philip secured the renunciation by the Aragonese king of any claim on the rights of succession of the Majorcan throne after the repayment of a great debt incurred by Sancho during an invasion by Sardinia. While the act solved the problem of succession, it also plunged the kingdom into a serious financial crisis.

James was forced to develop policies similar to that of Aragon's. To that end, he was forced to participate in the war against Genoa (1329-1336), which resulted in the loss of various economic markets for the kingdom. Again, it was necessary to impose new taxes and fines, which were levied on the Jewish community, though this was insufficient to resolve the financial crisis. The problems of the kingdom did not appear to have an end since in 1341, Peter IV of Aragon closed relations with the Kingdom of Majorca as a prelude to invasion. In May 1343, Peter IV invaded the Balearic Islands and followed that in 1344 with the invasions of the counties of Roussillon and Cerdanya. James III was able to keep only his French possessions. After the sale of these possessions to the King of France in 1349, James III left for Majorca. He was defeated and killed at the Battle of Llucmajor on 25 October 1349. Then, the Kingdom of Majorca was definitively incorporated into the Crown of Aragon.

Fall of Majorca
The extinction of the Kingdom of Majorca was inevitable given the conflicts by which it was affected: the Hundred Years War between France and England; the war of the benimerines, which involved Castile and the Crown of Aragon as well as attempts by the Genoese to make the Balearics a satellite state. The Kingdom of Majorca, which had bonds of vassalage with the crowns of France (through Montpellier) and Aragon, could not remain neutral during the conflicts. In addition, increased taxes to fund the kingdom's economy during its neutrality managed to unsettle the people of the kingdom.

See also
List of monarchs of Majorca

References

 A Mediterranean emporium - The Catalan kingdom of Majorca, by David Abulafia, 
 Abulafia, David. The Western Mediterranean Kingdoms, 1200-1500. 1997.

External links
—Genealogía, Reyes y Reinos: Reino de Mallorca
—La Conquista de Mallorca en mapas y cuadros

 
Majorca
Crown of Aragon
History of the Balearic Islands
Majorca
Castile|Majorca
Majorca
Majorca
States and territories established in 1231
States and territories disestablished in 1715
1231 establishments in Europe
1715 disestablishments in Spain
13th-century establishments in Aragon